In Greek mythology, the name Crete (Ancient Greek: Κρήτη) may refer to several figures, all of whom are associated with the homonymous island of Crete, and may have been considered its eponyms:

Crete, daughter of Hesperus and one of the Hesperides and another possible eponym of Crete.
Crete, daughter of one of the Cretan Curetes, who married Ammon. She was actually said to have given her name to the island Crete, which was believed to have previously been called Idaea.
Crete, possible mother of Pasiphaë by Helios.
Crete, daughter of Asterion (Asterius), who married Minos, in one version. In this regard, she was considered the mother of Acacallis, Ariadne, Androgeus, Deucalion, Phaedra, Glaucus, Catreus and Xenodice.
Crete, daughter of Deucalion (son of Minos), sister of Idomeneus and half-sister of Molus.

See also
Cres (mythology)

Notes

References 

 Apollodorus, The Library with an English Translation by Sir James George Frazer, F.B.A., F.R.S. in 2 Volumes, Cambridge, MA, Harvard University Press; London, William Heinemann Ltd. 1921. ISBN 0-674-99135-4. Online version at the Perseus Digital Library. Greek text available from the same website.
Diodorus Siculus, The Library of History translated by Charles Henry Oldfather. Twelve volumes. Loeb Classical Library. Cambridge, Massachusetts: Harvard University Press; London: William Heinemann, Ltd. 1989. Vol. 3. Books 4.59–8. Online version at Bill Thayer's Web Site
 Diodorus Siculus, Bibliotheca Historica. Vol 1-2. Immanel Bekker. Ludwig Dindorf. Friedrich Vogel. in aedibus B. G. Teubneri. Leipzig. 1888–1890. Greek text available at the Perseus Digital Library.
Stephanus of Byzantium, Stephani Byzantii Ethnicorum quae supersunt, edited by August Meineike (1790-1870), published 1849. A few entries from this important ancient handbook of place names have been translated by Brady Kiesling. Online version at the Topos Text Project.
Tzetzes, John, Book of Histories, Book II-IV translated by Gary Berkowitz from the original Greek of T. Kiessling's edition of 1826. Online version at theio.com

Hesperides
Princesses in Greek mythology
Queens in Greek mythology
Cretan characters in Greek mythology
Women of Helios